Maleček (feminine Malečková) is a Czech surname. Notable people include:

 Antonín Maleček (1909–1964), Czech table tennis player
 Jesika Malečková (born 1994), Czech tennis player
 Josef Maleček (1903–1982), Czech ice hockey player
 Václav Maleček (born 1974), Czech rower

Czech-language surnames